Agassizia scrobiculata is a species of sea urchin of the family Prenasteridae.

References 

Spatangoida
Animals described in 1846